Antiochia Lamotis, Antiochia in Isauria, or Antiochia super Cragum is a Hellenistic city in ancient Cilicia, Anatolia at the mouth of Lamos (or Lamus) river. The site is on the coast a few km southwest of Erdemli, Mersin Province, Turkey.

During Roman times, it was capital of the Lamotis Region, Cilicia. The town also bore the name Lamus or Lamos (Λάμος). The river is mentioned by Stephanus of Byzantium, and both the river and the town by Strabo and Ptolemy. The river, which is otherwise of no importance, formed the boundary between Cilicia Aspera and Cilicia Propria.

The town later became the seat of a bishop; no longer a residential bishopric, it remains a titular see in the Roman Catholic Church under the name of Lamus.

References

Archaeological sites in Mersin Province, Turkey
Ancient Greek archaeological sites in Turkey
Seleucid colonies in Anatolia
Roman sites in Turkey
Ruins in Turkey
Former populated places in Cilicia
Geography of Mersin Province
Populated places in ancient Cilicia
Populated places in ancient Isauria